Yuriy Yurkov (born March 11, 1983, in Shymkent) is a Kazakhstani sport shooter. Yurkov represented Kazakhstan at the 2008 Summer Olympics in Beijing, where he competed for all three rifle shooting events.

In his first event, 10 m air rifle, Yurkov was able to hit a total of 586 points within six attempts, finishing forty-second in the qualifying rounds. Few days later, he placed forty-second again this time in the 50 m rifle prone, by one target behind Austria's Christian Planer from the second attempt, with a total score of 588 points. In his third and last event, 50 m rifle 3 positions, Yurkov was able to shoot 395 targets in a prone position, 382 in standing, and 385 in kneeling, for a total score of 1,162 points, finishing only in twenty-seventh place.

References

External links
NBC 2008 Olympics profile

Kazakhstani male sport shooters
Living people
Olympic shooters of Kazakhstan
Shooters at the 2008 Summer Olympics
Shooters at the 2016 Summer Olympics
People from Shymkent
1983 births
Asian Games medalists in shooting
Shooters at the 2006 Asian Games
Shooters at the 2010 Asian Games
Shooters at the 2014 Asian Games
Asian Games silver medalists for Kazakhstan
Asian Games bronze medalists for Kazakhstan
Medalists at the 2006 Asian Games
Medalists at the 2010 Asian Games
Medalists at the 2014 Asian Games
Shooters at the 2018 Asian Games
Shooters at the 2020 Summer Olympics